Shenzhou 10 was a crewed spaceflight of China's Shenzhou program that was launched on 11 June 2013. It was China's fifth crewed space mission. The mission had a crew of three astronauts: Nie Haisheng, who was mission commander and previously flew on Shenzhou 6; Zhang Xiaoguang, a former PLAAF squadron commander who conducted the rendezvous and docking; and Wang Yaping, the second Chinese female astronaut. The Shenzhou spacecraft docked with the Tiangong-1 trial space laboratory module on 13 June, and the astronauts performed physical, technological, and scientific experiments while on board. Shenzhou 10 was the 2nd and final expedition and mission to Tiangong-1 in this portion of the Tiangong program. On 26 June 2013, after a series of successful docking tests, Shenzhou 10 returned to Earth.

Preparations
Prior to the reboost of Tiangong-1 on 30 August 2012, it was projected that a launch window would open between late November and December 2012, when Tiangong-1's orbit had decayed to the level of a Shenzhou's standard orbit. With the reboost, it was expected that the orbital decay would bring Tiangong-1 within reach again in late January, so the Shenzhou 10 mission was anticipated for late January or February 2013. At the 18th National Congress of the Chinese Communist Party, a space official stated that Shenzhou 10 was planned for the period between June and August 2013.

It is the fifth crewed mission of the Shenzhou program, coming ten years after the original, Shenzhou 5.

From 2012 November onwards, a feed of information ensued, including a desire for the crew to have a female member and that the actual launch date would be at the beginning of the June–August period. Knowledge of the conditions that China sets for launch windows for its piloted spacecraft allowed the likely launch date to be calculated as somewhere in the period between 7 and 13 June.

Xinhua News Agency published an item from the Beijing Times that summed up the aims of the mission, and included the information that Wang Yaping was the only female trainee in the group of astronaut candidates. Wang Yaping was announced to be the one of the crew in April 2013, the only member of the crew revealed until June, when the rest of the crew was revealed. The crew of Shenzhou 10 previously served as the backup crew to Shenzhou 9. With Nie Haisheng's elevation to general, this marked the first instance that China would launch a flag officer into space, after they had become a general officer.

Launch and docking
Shenzhou 10 was launched on 11 June 2013, at 09:38 UTC (17:38 local time). A Long March 2F carrier rocket was used to perform the launch, flying from Pad 1 of the South Launch Site at the Jiuquan Satellite Launch Center in Inner Mongolia. The spacecraft successfully reached low Earth orbit before the rocket detached. With a duration of 15 days, Shenzhou 10 was China's longest human spaceflight mission to date, surpassing the previous record holder, Shenzhou 9 by two days. CPC General Secretary, Chinese President Xi Jinping was present for both the departure ceremony, and the launch itself.

The spacecraft docked with Tiangong-1 at 05:11 UTC on 13 June. The crew opened the hatch three hours later and entered the laboratory module.

Landing
Shenzhou 10 returned to Earth on Wednesday, 26 June 2013 00:07 UTC. Total mission duration was 14 days 14 hours and 29 minutes.

Objectives
Once docked at Tiangong-1, the three crew members conducted space medicine and technological experiments and other scientific endeavours. Nie Haisheng was mission commander, overseeing docking procedures, and pilot Zhang Xiaoguang was in charge of rendezvous and docking. Wang Yaping conducted the scientific experiments and taught a physics lesson to Chinese students by live television broadcast. On 23 June, Shenzhou 10 undocked from the station and performed a manual re-docking.

Crew

While in orbit, Wang Yaping was one of only two women in space on 16 June 2013, the 50th anniversary of Vostok 6, the first space flight by a woman, Valentina Tereshkova. The other woman in space that day was Karen Nyberg on board the International Space Station.

See also

Chinese space program
 Chinese women in space
Jiuquan Satellite Launch Center
Long March 2F
Tiangong program

References

External links 

 
 

2013 in China
Human spaceflights
Shenzhou program
Spacecraft launched in 2013
Spacecraft which reentered in 2013
Tiangong program